Anca Pahuas (possibly from Quechua anka eagle or black-chested buzzard-eagle, phaway, phawa flight,  "eagle flight") is a mountain in the Huanzo mountain range in the Andes of Peru, about  high. It is situated in the Arequipa Region, Condesuyos Province, Cayarani District, and in the La Unión Province, Puyca District. Anca Pahuas lies between Quelcata in the northeast and Condori in the southwest.

References 

Mountains of Peru
Mountains of Arequipa Region